Sergio Sebastián Ariosa Moreira (born 5 June 1985 in Montevideo, Uruguay) is a Uruguayan footballer who plays for San Lorenzo.

Olimpia 

On 15 January 2011, Ariosa signs for Paraguayan Club Olimpia.

Illness and legal case 

Ariosa was diagnosed with a chest tumor in 2013, and was suspended by Olimpia for missing training due to his chemotherapy. He terminated his link with the club in January 2014. In August 2015, the Court of Arbitration for Sport ordered Olimpia to pay compensation to Ariosa for moral damages. He had since recovered from his illness.

Teams
 Defensor Sporting 2004-2010
 Olimpia 2011-2014
 Defensor Sporting 2015–present

Titles
 Defensor Sporting 2007-2008 (Uruguayan Championship)
 Club Olimpia Clausura 2011 (Paraguayan Championship)

References

External links
 
 

1985 births
Living people
Uruguayan footballers
Uruguayan expatriate footballers
Uruguay international footballers
Uruguayan Primera División players
Paraguayan Primera División players
Defensor Sporting players
Club Olimpia footballers
Expatriate footballers in Paraguay
Association football fullbacks